Campylorhamphus is a bird genus in the woodcreeper subfamily (Dendrocolaptinae). They are found in wooded habitats in South America and southern Central America, and all have very long, somewhat scythe-shaped bills.

The greater scythebill was formerly included in this genus, but it is closer to the scimitar-billed woodcreeper.

Species

References

External links

 
Bird genera
Taxonomy articles created by Polbot
Taxa named by Arnoldo de Winkelried Bertoni